Trepan may refer to:
Trepanning, the medical procedure
Trepan (drill bit), a type of drill bit
Trepan (grape), another name for the Spanish wine grape Trepat
Trepan Records, a record label

See also
Trepanation (disambiguation)
Trepang (disambiguation)
Trephine